Yekaterina Antonyuk (born 1 May 1974) is a Belarusian cross-country skier. She competed in two events at the 1998 Winter Olympics.

References

External links
 

1974 births
Living people
Belarusian female cross-country skiers
Olympic cross-country skiers of Belarus
Cross-country skiers at the 1998 Winter Olympics
People from Magadan
Sportspeople from Magadan Oblast